Anne-Sophie Endeler (born 5 May 1984) is a French gymnast. She competed at the 2000 Summer Olympics.

References

External links
 

1984 births
Living people
French female artistic gymnasts
Olympic gymnasts of France
Gymnasts at the 2000 Summer Olympics